Elizabeth Webber, character in General Hospital.

Elizabeth or Lizzie Web(b)er may also refer to:

Beth Webber, character in The Company of Strangers
Elizabeth Weber, writer
Elizabeth Webber Harris, awarded honorary Victoria Cross
Lizzie Webber (1852), see William Pile (shipbuilder)
Lizzie Weber reef on Malaysia–Vietnam border